Sean Costello (born 1951 in Ottawa, Ontario) is a Canadian author of horror fiction and an anesthesiologist living in Sudbury, Ontario.

His first three novels, published in North America by Pocket Books, have been released in the United Kingdom by Tor Books and translated into Dutch, German and Russian. Finders Keepers and Sandman were published by Red Tower Publications, and Here After has been optioned to film. Squall, from Your Scrivener Press, was released in trade paperback in October 2014.

Recently, all eight of Costello's titles have been published as ebooks on Amazon.com, B&N, Kobo and several other platforms.

Costello published, Terminal House, in 2017.

Works
 Eden's Eyes (1989)
 The Cartoonist (1990)
 Captain Quad (1991)
 Finders Keepers (2002)
 Sandman (2003)
 Here After (2008)
 Squall (2014)
 Last Call (2015)
 Terminal House (2017)

References

External links
 Sean Costello

Canadian male novelists
Canadian horror writers
Living people
Writers from Greater Sudbury
Writers from Ottawa
1951 births
Canadian anesthesiologists
20th-century Canadian novelists
21st-century Canadian novelists
20th-century Canadian male writers
21st-century Canadian male writers